CCJ  may stand for:

Chenab College Jhang, Institute in Pakistan
Cadet College Jhelum, Institute in Pakistan
Calicut International Airport's IATA code
Conseil consultatif sur la jeunesse, a non-governmental decision-making body in the Council of Europe.
Caribbean Court of Justice
Cornway College a private, co-educational, day and boarding school in Zimbabwe.
Council of Christians and Jews
County Court judgment
Cameco's NYSE symbol